Robert Purvis (1810–1898), was an American abolitionist.

Robert Purvis, Bob Purvis, Rob Purvis, and other variations can also refer to:

 Bob Purvis (footballer) (born 1948), former Scottish footballer, played for Queen's Park
 Bob Purvis (songwriter) (Robert J. Purvis), member of the 1970s British musical group Splinter (band)
 Bob Purvis, UKIP candidate for the Spennymoor by-election in 2019, Durham County Council elections
 Bob Purvis Sr (Robert H. Purvis) and his son Bob Purvis Jr (after whom Purvis banks were named), both lessees of Woodgreen Station, a cattle station in the Northern Territory of Australia
 Rob Purvis, baseball player in the 1999 Major League Baseball draft
 Robert Purvis (musical director), faculty at the Arden School of Theatre
 Robert Purvis (politician) (1844–1920), British barrister and Liberal Unionist politician